A control panel is a flat, often vertical, area where control or monitoring instruments are displayed or it is an enclosed unit that is the part of a system that users can access, such as the control panel of a security system (also called control unit).

They are found in factories to monitor and control machines or production lines and in places such as nuclear power plants, ships, aircraft and mainframe computers. Older control panels are most often equipped with push buttons and analog instruments, whereas nowadays in many cases touchscreens are used for monitoring and control purposes.

Gallery

Flat panels

Enclosed control unit

See also 

 Control stand
 Dashboard
 Electric switchboard
 Fire alarm control panel
 Front panel 
 Graphical user interface
 Control panel (computer)
 Dashboard (software) virtual
 Lighting control console
 Mixing console
 Patch board
 Plugboard
 Telephone switchboard

Control devices